Eightfold Way may refer to:

 Noble Eightfold Path, Buddhist doctrine
 Eightfold Way (physics), particle-physics theory  
 Eightfold Path (policy analysis)